Group B of the 2015 Copa América was one of the three groups of competing nations in the 2015 Copa América. It consisted of Argentina, Uruguay (title holders), Paraguay, and guests Jamaica of CONCACAF. Group play began on 13 June 2015 and ended on 20 June 2015.

Argentina, Paraguay and Uruguay advanced to the quarter-finals.

Teams

Notes

Standings

In the quarter-finals:
Argentina advanced to play Colombia (third-placed team of Group C).
Paraguay advanced to play Brazil (winners of Group C).
Uruguay (as one of the two best third-placed teams) advanced to play Chile (winners of Group A).

Matches
All times local, CLT (UTC−3).

Uruguay vs Jamaica

Argentina vs Paraguay

Paraguay vs Jamaica

Argentina vs Uruguay

Uruguay vs Paraguay

Argentina vs Jamaica

References

External links
 (Official website) 
Copa América 2015, CONMEBOL.com 

Group B
Group
Group B
2014–15 in Jamaican football
2015 in Paraguayan football